USS Truxtun has been the name of various United States Navy ships in honor of Commodore Thomas Truxtun, and may refer to:

, a brig launched in 1842 and destroyed after running aground off Mexico in 1846
, a destroyer in service from 1902 to 1919
, a destroyer commissioned in 1921 that ran aground and sank in 1942
, laid down as a destroyer escort (DE-282) in 1943, completed as a high-speed transport (APD-98) in 1945, and in commission as such from 1945 to 1946.
, originally guided missile destroyer leader DLGN-35, a guided missile cruiser in commission from 1967 to 1995

United States Navy ship names